The 2013–14 season was Viktoria Plzeň's ninth consecutive season in the Gambrinus liga. Having won the Gambrinus liga the previous season, they entered the competition as defending champions and finished second. As league champions they also took part in the UEFA Champions League, from which they qualified for the UEFA Europa League.

Season overview
The club's budget for the 2013–14 season was 100 million crowns, the third-highest budget in the league. This was lower than Slavia Prague (110 million) and Sparta Prague (300 million).

Pre-season
Viktoria started pre-season training schedule on 17 June at home grounds in Plzeň and until end of June team played three matches with local teams from West Bohemia. From the beginning of July the team moved to Austrian Westendorf for a training preparation camp including three games with ex-Bundesliga side Fürth, Russian Premier League team Krasnodar and last year's Champions League participant CFR Cluj.

During the summer transfer window Viktoria introduced two new players – Tomáš Hořava from Olomouc and Milan Petržela, who returned to the club after an unsuccessful season in Augsburg.

Players

Squad

Source: iDnes.cz

Transfers In

1 Estimated transfer fee is 14M Kč.

Loans Out

Matches

Friendlies

Pre-season

Gambrinus liga

Results summary

League table

Results by round

Matches

July

August

September

October

November

December

February

March

April

May

Czech Supercup 
As winners of the previous season's Gambrinus liga, Plzeň played defending cup winners FK Jablonec in the Czech Supercup on 12 July. Plzeň's manager Pavel Vrba left many key players on the bench before the first leg of the second qualifying round of Champions League, which was four days later.

Plzeň took an early lead and despite other chances, the first half ended 1–0. During the second half, Jablonec were the better team and scored two goals in a six-minute spell to take the lead. In the 89th minute Tomáš Wágner from Plzeň had a disallowed goal because of offside. In stoppage time Jablonec scored their third goal and although three minutes later Plzeň scored, the match finished 2–3.

UEFA Champions League

Plzeň came through three qualifying rounds including the playoff round before reaching the group stage. The club lost all of their first five group stage matches. In the final group stage match, losing 1–0 to CSKA Moscow at home with 76 minutes played, CSKA had two players sent off and Plzeň scored two goals as the match finished 2–1. This result qualified them for the Europa League.

Second qualifying round

Third qualifying round

Play off round

Group stage

References

External links 
Official Website

FC Viktoria Plzeň seasons
Viktoria Plzen
Viktoria Plzen